Ghulam Mohammed is an Indian politician and a member of the 16th Uttar Pradesh Assembly and 18th Uttar Pradesh Assembly of India. He represents the Siwalkhas constituency of Uttar Pradesh and is a member of the Rashtriya Lok Dal  political party.

Early life and  education
Ghulam Mohammed  was born in Meerut district, Uttar Pradesh. He attended the Chaudhary Charan Singh University and attained Bachelor of Education & Bachelor of Laws degrees.

Political  career
Ghulam Mohammed has been a MLA for one term. He represented the Siwalkhas constituency and is a member of the Samajwadi Party political  party.

Posts Held

See also
Siwalkhas (Assembly constituency)
Sixteenth Legislative Assembly of Uttar Pradesh
Uttar Pradesh Legislative Assembly
18th Uttar Pradesh Assembly

References 

Samajwadi Party politicians
Uttar Pradesh MLAs 2012–2017
Chaudhary Charan Singh University alumni
People from Meerut district
1953 births
Living people
Uttar Pradesh MLAs 2022–2027